Dynamics, Equations and Applications (DEA 2019) was a large international conference organized by the Faculty of Applied Mathematics at the AGH University of Science and Technology to celebrate the 100th anniversary of the founding of the university. 

The main topics of DEA 2019 were dynamical systems, partial differential equations and applied mathematics. The conference took place from 16 to 20 September 2019 in Kraków. Its originator and the chairman of the Organizing Committee was Krzysztof Ciepliński. 

With 444 participants from 50 countries, 413 talks, 52 ICM speakers, and 5 Fields Medallists it was one of the most important mathematical events of 2019 in the world.

Participants 

There were 444 participants from about 270 universities and research institutes from all over the world. They represented 50 countries located in Africa, Asia, Australia, Europe, North America and South America; the most numerous of them were those from Poland (83), the USA (51), the UK (45), France (41), Germany (28), Italy (27), Spain (17), Austria (13), Switzerland (13), the Czech Republic (10), China (9), Israel (9), Japan (8), Canada (7), Hungary (7), Sweden (7), Chile (6), and Russia (6).

Among the participants of DEA 2019 were 52 scientists who had previously given invited lectures at the International Congresses of Mathematicians, including 5 winners of the Fields Medal: Artur Avila, Alessio Figalli, Martin Hairer, Stanislav Smirnov, and Shing-Tung Yau. In addition to the main speakers, the conference was attended by many other world-renowned mathematicians, including Tim Austin, Tomasz Downarowicz, Romain Dujardin, Bassam Fayad, Peter Friz, Mariusz Lemańczyk, Barbara Niethammer, Gabriella Pinzari, Filip Rindler, Elisabetta Rocca, Benjamin Schlein, Jan Philip Solovej, Anders Szepessy, Masato Tsujii, and Dmitry Turaev (they all gave keynote talks) as well as Ellen Baake, Semyon Dyatlov, Matthew Foreman, Krystyna Kuperberg, Michał Misiurewicz, Feliks Przytycki, Walter Schachermayer, Sebastian van Strien, and Benjamin Weiss.

Programme 

The conference was organized in 16 parallel sessions from 4 research fields:
 dynamical systems and ergodic theory (parallel sessions: topological dynamics, complex dynamics, ergodic theory, and smooth dynamical systems),
 partial differential equations (parallel sessions: calculus of variations, control theory, numerical methods, and stochastic partial differential equations),
 other types of equations, dynamics and computation (parallel sessions: ordinary differential equations, difference equations, functional equations, and dynamics, equations and computation),
 mathematics in other sciences and technology (parallel sessions: mathematical physics, mathematics for life sciences, financial mathematics, and industrial mathematics).

There were 4 types of talks:
 plenary lectures (one hour long and aimed at all participants),
 invited talks (40 minutes long and aimed at participants from each research field separately),
 keynote talks (30 minutes long and aimed at participants from each parallel session separately),
 contributed talks (20 minutes long and aimed at participants from each parallel session separately).

The scientific programme of DEA 2019 included:

 Alessio Figalli's public lecture From optimal transport to soap bubbles and clouds: a personal journey, 
 6 plenary lectures, 
 38 invited talks (9-10 in each research field),
 368 keynote and contributed talks (20-25 in each parallel session). 

In consequence, altogether 413 talks were given; 52 of them by International Congresses of Mathematicians plenary and invited speakers.

Main Speakers

Plenary Speakers 

 Artur Avila
 Alessio Figalli
 Martin Hairer
 Stanislav Smirnov
 Shing-Tung Yau
 Maciej Zworski

Invited Speakers

Dynamics 

 Viviane Baladi
 Tien-Cuong Dinh
 Manfred Einsiedler
 Michael Hochman
 Vadim Kaloshin
 Raphaël Krikorian
 Jens Marklof
 Mark Pollicott
 Grzegorz Świątek

Equations I 

 Stefano Bianchini
 Yoshikazu Giga
 David Jerison
 Sergiu Klainerman
 Aleksandr Logunov
 Felix Otto
 Endre Süli
 András Vasy
 Luis Vega
 Enrique Zuazua

Equations II 

 Luigi Chierchia
 Rafael de la Llave
 Desmond Higham
 Hinke Osinga
 Vladimir Protasov
 Emmanuel Trélat
 Warwick Tucker
 Walter Van Assche
 Sjoerd Verduyn Lunel
 Jiangong You

Applications 

 Weizhu Bao
 Russel Caflisch
 Albert Cohen
 Hugo Duminil-Copin
 László Erdős
 Eduard Feireisl
 Mats Gyllenberg
 Clément Mouhot
 Thaleia Zariphopoulou

References

External links
Conference website

Mathematics conferences